Iranian legislative elections are held every four years to elect members of the Islamic Consultative Assembly.

Elections after revolution

Notes and references

Notes

References

Islamic Consultative Assembly